North Houston Baptist School (NHBS) was a Baptist private school in Houston, Texas, and a ministry of North Houston Baptist Church, in operation from 1972-2011.

It served elementary school through senior high school. The church and school were previously at 125 West Little York Road, and later were at a temporary location at the Iglesia Bautista Fundamental del Norte de Houston at 706 Cather; the building was previously dedicated to the church's Spanish language ministry.

See also
 List of schools in Houston
 List of schools in Harris County, Texas

References

External links

North Houston Baptist Church

Baptist schools in the United States
Baptist Christianity in Texas
Christian schools in Texas
Defunct Christian schools in the United States
High schools in Harris County, Texas
Private K-12 schools in Texas
Religious schools in Houston